Michael "Woody" Woodmansey (born 4 February 1950) is an English rock drummer best known for his work in the early 1970s as a member of David Bowie's core backing ensemble that became known as the Spiders from Mars in conjunction with the release of Bowie's 1972 LP The Rise and Fall of Ziggy Stardust and the Spiders from Mars. With the death of Bowie in January 2016, Woodmansey became the last surviving member of the Ziggy Stardust studio band.

In May 1978, he became the drummer of the band Screen Idols, who had success with two albums in the UK.

Career
Woodmansey joined Bowie's backing group Hype, which later became the Spiders from Mars. He played on Bowie's albums The Man Who Sold the World (1970), Hunky Dory (1971), The Rise and Fall of Ziggy Stardust and the Spiders from Mars (1972) and Aladdin Sane (1973).

Woodmansey was replaced in the Spiders from Mars by Aynsley Dunbar, who played on Bowie's next album, the 1973 covers album Pin Ups. Woodmansey re-formed the Spiders from Mars for one album, along with bass player Trevor Bolder. This necessitated a change of personnel, with Dave Black on lead guitar (because Mick Ronson was unavailable) and Pete McDonald supplying lead vocals. Guest keyboardist was Mike Garson, who had been a major part of Bowie's line-up from the Ziggy Stardust days. Bowie made no contribution to the album, which was titled The Spiders From Mars.

Woodmansey converted to Scientology after being introduced to it by Mike Garson and had his wedding service at a Scientology church in Sussex.

After the final disbandment of the Spiders, he formed his own band, Woody Woodmansey's U-Boat, with Phil Murray, Frankie Marshall, Phil Plant and eventually Martin Smith, releasing a debut album U Boat in 1977. The album was subsequently re-released in 2006 as Woody Woodmansey's U-Boat (Castle Music ESMCD895).
 
Woodmansey has also played with Art Garfunkel, was a member of the band Cybernauts, and is currently the featured drummer with 3-D. He also co-led, with Tony Visconti, the supergroup Holy Holy, performing David Bowie songs from the 1970s, including the full The Man Who Sold the World album. Woodmansey toured with Holy Holy in September 2014, and followed up with tours of the UK, US and Japan during the following two years. The group has featured Erdal Kızılçay, Glenn Gregory, Steve Norman, Marc Almond and James Stevenson. It was announced that Woodmansey would not be participating in the 2022 Holy Holy tour, due to his being unvaccinated with regard to COVID-19. Woodsmansey said he had a "medical exemption" from the vaccine while saying he harbouring no "negative feelings" towards the band and a spokesperson for the band issued a statement that "It is incredibly sad that personal beliefs over the vaccine has  to the break-up of the original incarnation of the band".

Woodmansey published his autobiography Spider From Mars: My Life With David Bowie in 2016. It was co-written with author Joel McIver and includes a foreword by Bowie's producer and friend Tony Visconti.

Discography

With David Bowie
The Man Who Sold the World (1970)
Hunky Dory (1971)
The Rise and Fall of Ziggy Stardust and the Spiders from Mars (1972)
Aladdin Sane (1973)
Ziggy Stardust - The Motion Picture (recorded live 1973, officially released 1983)
Santa Monica '72 (recorded live 1972, officially released 1994)

With Dana Gillespie
Weren't Born a Man (1974)

With The Spiders From Mars
The Spiders from Mars (1976)

With Woody Woodmansey's U-Boat
Woody Woodmansey's U-Boat (1977)

with Screen Idols
Premiere (1979)

With Cybernauts
Cybernauts Live (2001)

With 3-D
Future Primitive (2008)

References

External links
Official website

1951 births
Living people
English rock drummers
People from Driffield
Glam rock musicians
The Hype (band) members
The Spiders from Mars members
Holy Holy (tribute band) members
English Scientologists